Lee Paje is a contemporary Filipino visual artist. She has shown her works in the Philippines, Taiwan, and Singapore. Her works explore themes of women and gender identity, myth-making, and unique contemporary lifestyles. In 2018, she won the Don Papa Rum Art Competition. She has been in residency at Art Omi in New York and at Kapitana Gallery in Negros Occidental.

Biography 
Lee Paje was born in 1980. She graduated with a Magna Cum Laude distinction for her Bachelor of Fine Arts degree, major in Painting from the University of the Philippines Diliman, Quezon City.

Works
Paje works with mediums such as painting on copper, sculpture, and video to convey visual narratives that highlight inequity in relation to gender and identity.  Some of her sculptural works include Teriapara (oil on relief, 2011) and Sanctus Cunnus, choclit (liqeuer-filled chocolates, 2011) both of which are reminiscent of female genitalia. Paje's series of tondos, including Sunday Afternoon, oil and etching on copper, acrylic on steel wool (2014) and Mother and Child, oil and etching on copper, acrylic on steel wool (2014), depict everyday scenes of love and familial relationships among the LGBTQ+ community, focusing not on the unconventionality of it, but its simple relationships.

Her most recent exhibition, 'Diin, San-O, Sin-O (Where, When, Who)' at Kapitana Gallery featured works that she had produced during her two-month residency at the Kapitana Gallery, where she continued her exploration of the links between place and identity.

Exhibitions

2017 

 'Diin, San-O, Sin-O (Where, When, Who)' at Kapitana Gallery

2016
'Unexpurgated' at Tin-aw Art Gallery

2014
Art Taipei: Young Artist Discovery

2013
Philippine Art Trek at Gallery Sogan & Art
'Bigoted' at Manila Contemporary

2011
'Mater Potestatem' at Tin-aw Art Gallery

Features
Artsy
Art+ Magazine
Blouin Art Info

References

1980 births
Filipino women artists
Living people
People from Quezon City
Artists from Metro Manila
People from Antipolo
Miriam College alumni
University of the Philippines Diliman alumni